Olaf Hagerup (29 September 1889 – 2 March 1961) was a Danish botanist. He studied botany at the University of Copenhagen from 1911 under the professors Eugenius Warming, Christen C. Raunkiær, L. Kolderup Rosenvinge og W. Johannsen. He took his Ph.D. from the same university in 1930. From 1934 to 1960, he was superintendent at the Botanical Museum of the University of Copenhagen.

Hagerup’s scientific works concern evolution, polyploidy and pollination, among other things. He showed that the tetraploid Empetrum hermaphroditum is a separate species from the diploid Empetrum nigrum. He thereby initiated the use of chromosome numbers in systematic botany, a field later known as cytotaxonomy. He put forward the hypothesis that the ploidy level is an important factor in the distribution and ecology of plant species. In contrast, another of his scientific ideas has been disproven by later modern research – the idea of a direct ancestry of the centrosperms (approximately equal to Caryophyllales) from the gymnospermous Gnetophyta and, hence, two separate evolutionary lineages within the flowering plants. Many of Hagerup’s studies were concerned with plant species of the Ericaceae, Empetraceae and related families, or ’’Bicornes’’ as they were known in the Wettstein system.

The cranberry Oxycoccus hagerupii (Ericaceae) was named to his honour by Á. & D. Löve (later transferred to Vaccinium by Hannu Ahokas as Vaccinium hagerupii.

Scientific works
Hagerup, O. (1915) The structure and biology of arctic flowering plants. 10. Caprifoliaceae. Linnaea borealis L. Meddelelser om Grønland 37: 151-164.
Hagerup, O. (1922)  Empetrum nigrum L.  (On Empetrum nigrum L. A study of natural history). Botanisk Tidsskrift 37 (4): 253-304.
Hagerup, O. (1922)  Erica cinerea L. (On ”Lobelia diagram” by Erica cinerea L.) Botanisk Tidsskrift 38: 137-140.
Hagerup, O. (1926)  Koenigia islandica L. (The anatomy and development of sexual structures in Koenigia islandica L.) Meddelelser om Grønland 58 (3): 197-204.
Hagerup, O. (1927) Empetrum hermaphroditum (Lge) Hagerup, a new tetraploid, bisexual species. Dansk Botanisk Arkiv 5 (2): 1–17.
Hagerup, O. (1928) Morphological and cytological studies of Bicornes. Dansk Botanisk Arkiv 6 (1): 1-27.
Hagerup, O. (1928)  (Aeschynomene aspera L.)  (A hydrophilic legume (Aeschynomene aspera L.) with bacterial nodules on the stem). Dansk Botanisk Arkiv 5 (14): 1-9.
Hagerup, O. (1929)  Raunkiær  Tombouctou. , Kongelige Danske Videnskabernes Selskab 9 (4): 1-116.
Hagerup, O. (1930) . Dansk Botanisk Arkiv 6 (4): 1-20.
Hagerup, O. (1930) . Doctoral dissertation, University of Copenhagen. Dansk Botanisk Arkiv 6 (8): 1-104.
Hagerup, O. (1932) . Hereditas 16: 19-40.
Hagerup, O. (1932) On Pollination in the extremely hot air at Timbuctu. Dansk Botanisk Arkiv 8 (1): 1-20.
Hagerup, O. (1933) Studies on polyploid ecotypes in Vaccinium uliginosum L. Hereditas 18 (1-2): 122-128.
Hagerup, O. (1933) . , Kongelige Danske Videnskabernes Selskab 10 (7).
Hagerup, O. (1934) . , Kongelige Danske Videnskabernes Selskab 11 (4): 1-83.
Hagerup, O. (1935) . , Kongelige Danske Videnskabernes Selskab 11 (9): 1-88.
Hagerup, O. (1936) . , Kongelige Danske Videnskabernes Selskab 13 (6): 1-60.
Hagerup, O. (1938) On the origin of some Angiosperms through the Gnetales and the Coniferae. III. The gynaecium of Salix cinerea. , Kongelige Danske Videnskabernes Selskab 14 (4): 1-34.
Hagerup, O. (1938) A peculiar asymmetrical mitosis in the microspore of Orchis. Hereditas 24: 94-96.
Hagerup, O. (1938) Studies on the significance of polyploidy. II. Orchis. Hereditas 24: 258-264.
Hagerup, O. (1939) On the origin of some Angiosperms through the Gnetales and the Coniferae. IV. The gynaecium of Personatae. , Kongelige Danske Videnskabernes Selskab 15 (2): 1-39.
Hagerup, O. (1939) Studies on the significance of polyploidy. III. Deschampsia and Aira. Hereditas 25: 185-192.
Hagerup, O. (1940) Studies on the significance of polyploidy. IV. Oxycoccus. Hereditas 26: 399-410.
Hagerup, O. (1941) . Planta 32: 6-14.
Hagerup, O. (1941)  Liparis og Malaxis. (Pollination in Liparis and Malaxis). Botanisk Tidsskrift 45: 396-402.
Hagerup, O. (1942) The morphology and biology of the Corylus-fruit. , Kongelige Danske Videnskabernes Selskab 17 (6): 1-42.
Hagerup, O. (1942) . (Ant pollination). Botanisk Tidsskrift 46: 116-123.
Hagerup, O. (1944) Notes on some boreal polyploids. Hereditas 30: 152-160.
Hagerup, O. (1944) On fertilization, polyploidy and haploidy in Orchis maculatus L. sens. lat. Dansk Botanisk Arkiv 11 (5): 1-26.
Hagerup, O. (1944) . (Cytology of the basidia by Tremellodon gelatinosum (Scop.) Pers). Friesia 3: 46-51.
Hagerup, O. (1945) Facultative parthenogenesis and haploidy in Epipactis latifolia. , Kongelige Danske Videnskabernes Selskab 19 (11): 1-14.
Hagerup, O. (1945)  (Limacella) lenticularis Lasch (Cytology of the basidia by Lepiota (Limacella) lenticularis Lasch). Friesia 3: 96-100.
Hagerup, O. (1946) Studies on the Empetraceae. , Kongelige Danske Videnskabernes Selskab 20 (5): 1-49.
Hagerup, O. (1947) The spontaneous formation of haploid, polyploid, and aneuploid embryos in some orchids. , Kongelige Danske Videnskabernes Selskab 20 (9): 1-22.
Hagerup, O. (1950) Thrips pollination in Calluna. , Kongelige Danske Videnskabernes Selskab 18 (4): 1-16.
Hagerup, O. (1950) Rain-pollination. , Kongelige Danske Videnskabernes Selskab 18 (5): 1-18.
Hagerup, O. (1951) Pollination in the Faroes - in spite of rain and poverty in insects. , Kongelige Danske Videnskabernes Selskab 18 (15): 1-48.
Hagerup, O. (1952) Bud autogamy in some northern orchids. Phytomorphology 2: 51-61.
Hagerup, O. (1952) The morphology and biology of some primitive orchid flowers. Phytomorphology 2: 134-138.
Hagerup, O. (1953)  Chamaeorchis. Blyttia 11: 1-5.
Hagerup, Else & Olaf (1953) Thrips pollination of Erica tetralix. New Phytologist 52 (1): 1-7
Hagerup, O. (1953) The morphology and systematics of the leaves in Ericales. Phytomorphology 3: 459-464.
Hagerup, O. (1953) Thrips-pollination in Hypochoeris radicata.  3: 55-58.
Hagerup, O. (1954) Autogamy in some drooping Bicornes flowers. Botanisk Tidsskrift 51: 103-116.
Hagerup, O. (1957) Wind autogamy in Arbutus. Bulletin du Jardin botanique de l'État a Bruxelles 27 (1): 41-47.
Hagerup, Olaf & Petersson, Vagn (1956–1960) Botanical Atlas. Copenhagen: Munksgaard.
Vol. I: Angiosperms, 550 p.
Vol. II: Mosses, Ferns, Horsetails, Clubmosses, Conifers, Evolution. 299 p.

References

20th-century Danish botanists
Botanists active in Africa
Academic staff of the University of Copenhagen
University of Copenhagen alumni
1889 births
1961 deaths